Aldehyde dehydrogenase family 3 member B2 is an enzyme that in humans is encoded by the ALDH3B2 gene.

This gene encodes a member of the aldehyde dehydrogenase family, a group of isozymes that may play a major role in the detoxification of aldehydes generated by alcohol metabolism and lipid peroxidation. The gene of this particular family member is over 10 kb in length. The expression of these transcripts is restricted to the salivary gland among the human tissues examined. Alternate transcriptional splice variants have been characterized.

References

External links

Further reading